Events from 2021 in Tuvalu.

Incumbents 
 Monarch: Elizabeth II
 Governor-General: Iakoba Italeli (until 28 September 2021) Tofiga Vaevalu Falani onwards
 Prime Minister: Kausea Natano

Events 
Ongoing – COVID-19 pandemic in Oceania; COVID-19 pandemic in Tuvalu

 28 September – Tofiga Vaevalu Falani is appointed Governor-General of Tuvalu.
 2 November – A traveller from Tuvalu tests positive for COVID-19 upon arrival in Auckland, New Zealand. Tuvalu had not previously reported any COVID-19 cases in the country.
 3 November – A lawyer representing the governments of Antigua and Barbuda and Tuvalu says that a new commission is being formed to sue big polluters and claim damage reparations for climate change effects on those nations before the International Tribunal for the Law of the Sea.
 11 November – Tuvaluan Justice, Communication and Foreign Affairs Minister Simon Kofe announces that the island nation will push to retain international recognition of its statehood and maritime borders in the event that rising sea levels completely submerge the country.

References 

 
Tuvalu
Tuvalu